Coreura phoenicides is a moth of the subfamily Arctiinae. It was described by Herbert Druce in 1884. It is found in Guatemala and Costa Rica.

References

Euchromiina
Moths described in 1884